Hoisington is a city in Barton County, Kansas, United States.  As of the 2020 census, the population of the city was 2,699.

History

In 1886, a group of Barton County businessmen formed the Central Kansas Town Company and founded the town of Hoisington to attract the Kansas and Colorado Railroad to the area. They named the settlement after Andrew J. Hoisington, one of the company partners and a prominent businessman in nearby Great Bend. The railroad reached Hoisington in the fall of 1886, and the settlement was incorporated as a city in 1887. The post office, relocated from nearby Buena Vista, was renamed Hoisington in April 1887 as was the railroad station, originally named Monon, by 1889.

Hoisington modernized and grew steadily over the following decades. The city's first power plant opened in 1903, and a city water system was completed in 1904. The railroad, known by that point as the Missouri Pacific, continued to play a central role in the city's development, employing 1,600 local men by 1911. Hoisington became a major freight and passenger operating division, complete with a roundhouse and shops. Electric street lights were installed in 1915, and the first streets were paved in 1917. The discovery of natural gas in the area in 1929, followed by the discovery of oil in the area in the 1930s, diversified and further stimulated the local economy.

On April 21, 2001, Hoisington suffered a large scale disaster, when an F4 tornado ripped through the city, destroying 5 miles with a path width of 3/8 of a mile. It came from the southwest corner and travelled almost straight into the middle of the city. One fatality was reported, as well as 28 injuries (2 critical). 200 homes and 12 businesses were destroyed and 85 homes were severely damaged; an additional 200 homes received minor to moderate damage. The city's population and commerce recovered quickly. Today the tornado's path can still be seen from the air due to the lack of trees, some empty lots, and the newer houses, which are larger and more spaced out than the older ones.

Geography
Hoisington is located at  (38.517301, -98.778422) at an elevation of 1,844 feet (562 m). It lies on the southern edge of the Smoky Hills region of the Great Plains. Blood Creek, which flows east into nearby Cheyenne Bottoms, passes immediately south of the city. The city sits astride the line between North and South Homestead Townships.

Demographics

As of 2009, the median household income in the city was $41,767, and the median family income was $56,767. The median income for males was $39,177 versus $27,009 for females. The per capita income for the city was $22,651. Approximately 6.9% of families and 9.8% of the population fell below the poverty line, including 6.1% of those under age 18 and 14.5% of those age 65 or over.

2010 census
As of the 2010 census, there were 2,706 people, 1,167 households, and 721 families in the city. The racial makeup of the city was 94.9% White, 1.1% African American, 0.4% American Indian, 1.1% from some other race, and 2.4% from two or more races. 4.1% of the population was Hispanic or Latino of any race.

There were 1,167 households, of which 29.9% had children under the age of 18, 48.5% were married couples living together, 4.2% had a male householder with no wife present, 9.1% had a female householder with no husband present, and 38.2% were non-families. 34.5% of all households were made up of individuals, and 18.0% had someone living alone who was 65 years of age or older. The average household size was 2.32, and the average family size was 2.98.

In the city, the population was spread out, with 26.0% under the age of 18, 6.7% from 18 to 24, 23.3% from 25 to 44, 26.5% from 45 to 64, and 17.5% who were 65 years of age or older. The median age was 39.3 years. For every 100 females, there were 92.2 males. For every 100 females age 18 and over, there were 87.9 males age 18 and over.

Education
The community is served by Hoisington USD 431 public school district with four schools in Hoisington:
 Hoisington High School (9-12)
 Hoisington Middle School (5-8)
 Lincoln Elementary School (3-4)
 Roosevelt Elementary School (PreK-2)

Transportation
U.S. Route 281 runs north–south through Hoisington, intersecting and briefly running concurrently with K-4 which runs east–west through the city.

The Hoisington Subdivision of the Kansas and Oklahoma Railroad runs east–west around the southern side of the city.

Media
Hoisington has two weekly newspapers: The Hoisington Dispatch and Tri-County News.

Radio station KHOK is licensed to Hoisington and broadcasts from Great Bend, Kansas on 100.7 FM, playing a Country format.

Fox affiliate KOCW, a satellite of KSAS-TV in Wichita, is licensed to Hoisington and broadcasts on digital channel 14.

Culture

In popular culture and the arts
The April 2001 storm was featured on an episode of The Weather Channel series Storm Stories. The tornado struck during the high school prom, and many of the prom goers were unaware the tornado had even hit—a fact that was the subject of the June 9, 2001 episode of the NPR radio show This American Life.

The ABC comedy Sports Night referenced Hoisington on October 13, 1998, in the episode "Intellectual Property." Associate Producer Jeremy Goodwin, challenged to find material to enable sports anchors Dan Rydell and Casey McCall to stretch a segment about a sporting event, notes that the "attendance at tonight's game, 11,323, is exactly the same as the population of Hoisington, Kansas."  Producer Dana Whitaker then relays to Dan and Casey that they have two options for stretching the segment:  report this odd "fact" about Hoisington, or "talk slower."  Hoisington's population in 1998 was probably much closer to 2,975, according to the 2000 census.

Notable people
Notable individuals who were born in and/or have lived in Hoisington include:
 Walter Broadnax (1944- ), public administration professor
 Doug Dumler (1950- ), football offensive lineman
 Kathryn Eames (1908-2004), actress
 Roy Ehrlich (1928-1997), Kansas state legislator
 L. Worth Seagondollar, atomic pioneer who worked on the Manhattan Project, born in Hoisington and raised in Emporia.
 Kari Wahlgren (1977- ), voice actress

References

Further reading

External links

 City of Hoisington
 Hoisington - Directory of Public Officials
 Photos from 2001 tornado damage
 Hoisington city map, KDOT

Cities in Kansas
Cities in Barton County, Kansas